The 1931 George Washington Colonials football team was an American football team that represented George Washington University as an independent during the 1931 college football season. In its third season under head coach Jim Pixlee, the team compiled a 5–2–2 record. The December 12 game against Alabama alumni was a 10-minute game played as part of a fundraiser for the poor during which the Alabama alumni played three short games against teams from the District of Columbia.

Schedule

References

George Washington
George Washington Colonials football seasons
George Washington Colonials football